Kettandapati is a railway station next in the suburbs of the southern Indian city of Madras, (Chennai). Its nearest town is Jolarpet.

References

Stations of Chennai Suburban Railway
Railway stations in Vellore district